Henry Brandeston (or Henry of Braunstone) was a medieval Bishop of Salisbury.

Life

Brandeston held the offices of archdeacon of Wiltshire, archdeacon of Dorset, and Dean of Salisbury, all in the diocese of Salisbury.

Brandeston was elected bishop on 2 January 1287 and consecrated on 1 June 1287. He was enthroned at Salisbury Cathedral on 19 October 1287.

Brandeston died on 11 February 1288.

Citations

References
 British History Online Archdeacons of Dorset accessed on 30 October 2007
 British History Online Bishops of Salisbury accessed on 30 October 2007
 British History Online Deans of Salisbury accessed on 30 October 2007
 

Bishops of Salisbury
Archdeacons of Dorset
Archdeacons of Wilts
13th-century English Roman Catholic bishops
Deans of Salisbury
1288 deaths
Year of birth unknown